James Robert Virgili (born 8 July 1992 in Newcastle, Australia) is an Australian football (soccer) player who plays for Lambton Jaffas.

Newcastle Jets
On 4 January 2009, he made his senior debut as a substitute against Wellington Phoenix. This also made him the youngest player in A-League history to make his debut at 16 years and 180 days. Virgili broke into the first team in the 2012/13 Hyundai A-League season. He became a regular starter known for his high speed and his ability to get past players with his dribbling and ball control. This benefited teammates such as strikers Emile Heskey and Ryan Griffiths.

Virgili was given a trial at Scottish Club Celtic, it was revealed that Celtic were keeping tabs on the young Australian.

Virgili was released at the end of the 2014/2015 season following a broken ankle sustained in training.

Career Statistics

References

External links
Newcastle Jets profile
AOC Youth Olympic Festival profile

1992 births
Living people
Australian soccer players
A-League Men players
National Premier Leagues players
Newcastle Jets FC players
Australian people of Italian descent
Sportspeople from Newcastle, New South Wales
New South Wales Institute of Sport alumni
Association football wingers
Broadmeadow Magic FC players